Beličica is a village in the municipality of Mavrovo and Rostuša, North Macedonia.

Demographics
In statistics gathered by Vasil Kanchov in 1900, the village of Beličica was inhabited by 450 Orthodox Albanians, of whom could speak Bulgarian while Albanian was the language of the household. In 1905 in statistics gathered by Dimitar Mishev Brancoff, Beličica was inhabited by 438 Albanians and had a Bulgarian school.
According to the 2002 census, the village had a total of 4 inhabitants. Ethnic groups in the village include:

Macedonians 4

References

Villages in Mavrovo and Rostuša Municipality
Albanian communities in North Macedonia